Khazar-e Yek (also Romanized as Khaẕar-e Yek and Kheẕer-e Yek) is a village in Shoaybiyeh-ye Gharbi Rural District, Shadravan District, Shushtar County, Khuzestan Province, Iran. At the 2006 census, its population was 336, in 48 families.

References 

Populated places in Shushtar County